Bardo Fransman (born 3 March 1979) is a South African cricketer. He played in 31 first-class and 38 List A matches for Boland and South Western Districts from 2003 to 2010.

References

External links
 

1979 births
Living people
South African cricketers
Boland cricketers
South Western Districts cricketers
Place of birth missing (living people)